JJR may refer to:
 Japanese Journal of Radiology
 Jazz Jackrabbit, video game series
 Jazz Jackrabbit (1994 video game)
 Jazz Jackrabbit (2002 video game)
 Jejuri, in Maharashtra, India
 Zhár (Bankal) dialect of Jarawa language of Nigeria